The Times of India Film Awards (also known as TOIFA Awards) are presented by The Times of India to honour both artistic and technical excellence of professionals in the Hindi language film industry of India. The awards were first introduced in 2013. The second edition of the award was held at Dubai on 18 March 2016.

Ceremonies

Acting Awards

Best Film

Best Actor Male

Best Actor Female

Best Director

Best Supporting Actor Male

Best Supporting Actor Female

Best Actor In A Comic Role

Best Actor In A Negative Role

Best Debut Male

Best Debut Female

Music Awards

Best Album

Song of The Year

Best Playback Singer Male

Best Playback Singer Female

Best Lyricist

Composer of The Year

Critics' Awards

Best Film

Best Actor Male

Best Actor Female

Best Debut Director

Technical Awards

Best Editing

Best Cinematography

Best Choreography

Best Background Score

Best Special Effects

Best Costume Design

Best Art Direction

Best Action

Best Sound Recording

Best Story

Best Screenplay

Best Dialogue

See also
 Bollywood
 Cinema of India

References

Awards established in 2013
The Times Group
2013 establishments in India